Karlshochschule International University is a state approved non-profit private foundation university based in Karlsruhe. It focuses with an inter- and transdisciplinary approach on critical management studies, cultural studies and social and political sciences. According to its unofficial motto "let's make a difference", it is committed to sustainability, social responsibility, etihcal practices, and the common good.

History
In 1903, the Merkur Akademie (M.A.I.) was founded. In 1992 the first Bachelor Programs were started. In 2004 "Merkur Internationale Fachhochschule - University of Applied Sciences" was founded and state approved, starting the first programs in 2005. On 27 May 2009 “Merkur Internationale Fachhochschule” was renamed to Karlshochschule International University.

Programs
In 2009 programs were accredited by FIBAA. They include courses in international business, digital transformation and ethics, and social transformation.

Partner Universities
Karlshochschule International University is partnered with universities in Australia, China, Belgium, and other countries.

Faculty

External links
 Karlshochschule International University

Universities and colleges in Germany
Universities and colleges in Karlsruhe
2004 establishments in Germany
Private universities and colleges in Europe
Private universities and colleges in Germany
Business schools in Germany
Companies based in Baden-Württemberg
Companies based in Karlsruhe
Educational institutions established in 2004